Roll Away the Stone is an album by American blues singer and guitarist Kelly Joe Phelps, released in 1997. It was his first release on the Rykodisc label and reached #10 on the Billboard Top Blues Albums charts.

Phelps' notes state "All songs recorded in my used to be a hotel now it's an apartment building apartment, between airplane take-offs and police sirens, deep in the winter of 1996, except "Cypress Grove" and "Go There" which were recorded in an empty house in Northeast Portland. Same Winter. Dave Schiffman engineered "Cypress Grove". Dale Lawrence supplied the house. Mixed at The Digs by Craig Carothers. Mastered by Toby Mountain at Northeastern Digital, Southboro, MA. Production remains a mystery..."

Reception

Writing for Allmusic, music critic D. Elaine McDonald wrote of the album "Phelps continues to grow as both a musician and songwriter, and his interpretations of classic blues songs show increased imagination. Although it's based in classic blues, this music doesn't sound ancient — it sounds vital and alive, like any great music should."  Thom Owen of No Depression magazine wrote "Phelps began his musical career playing jazz, and those roots are evident in his introspective, sandpapery vocals on Roll Away The Stone... The three traditional songs here would be at home on Phelps’ first record. He sticks to a simple and respectful reading of these numbers, relying on their timelessness and his silken voice for effect."

Track listing
All songs written by Kelly Joe Phelps except as noted.
"Roll Away the Stone" – 4:50
"Sail the Jordan" – 6:01
"When The Roll Is Called Up Yonder" (James Milton Black) – 5:52
"Hosanna" – 8:46
"Without the Light" – 4:44
"Footprints" (Traditional) – 4:35
"Go There" – 4:17
"See That My Grave Is Kept Clean" (Blind Lemon Jefferson, Lewis) – 6:50
"Cypress Grove" (Skip James) – 6:42
"That's Alright" (Traditional)– 3:25
"Doxology" (Traditional)– 2:14

Personnel
Kelly Joe Phelps - vocals, 6- and 12-string lap slide guitars, 6-string conventional guitar

References

External links
Discography at Kelly Joe Phelps official web site.

1997 albums
Kelly Joe Phelps albums
Rykodisc albums